Khachrod railway station is a railway station of  division, Western Railways situated on the very middle of Mumbai–Delhi main line. Its code is KUH. It serves Khachrod city. The station consists of two platforms. Passenger, MEMU, Express, and Superfast trains have the stoppages at Khachrod.

Major trains

The following trains halt at Khachrod railway station in both up and down directions:

Superfast and Mail/Express trains:

 11463/64 Somnath–Jabalpur Express (via Itarsi)
 11465/66 Somnath–Jabalpur Express (via Bina)
 19309/10 Shanti Express
 19165/66 Ahmedabad–Darbhanga Sabarmati Express
 19167/68 Sabarmati Express
 19329/30 Veer Bhumi Chittaurgarh Express
 19023/24 Firozpur Janata Express
 22943/44 Indore–Pune Express
 12961/62 Avantika Express
 19311/12 Indore–Pune Express
 19711/12 Bhopal–Jaipur Express
 59307/19711-Slip Bhopal–Jaipur Express
 19037/38 Bandra Terminus–Gorakhpur Avadh Express
 19039/40 Bandra Terminus–Muzaffarpur Avadh Express
 19019/20 Dehradun Express

Passenger trains:
 69184/83 Dahod–Ujjain MEMU Passenger
 69155/56 Ratlam–Mathura MEMU Passenger
 59802/03 Jaipur/Kota–Ratlam Fast Passenger
 59317/18 Bina–Ratlam Fast Passenger
 59393/94 Bhopal–Dahod DEMU Fast Passenger
 59831/32 Kota Junction–

References

Railway stations in Ujjain district
Ratlam railway division